Dynoides viridis is a species of isopod in the family Sphaeromatidae.

References

viridis